The 2018 Men's Hockey Düsseldorf Masters was the twenty-first edition of the Hamburg Masters, an international men's field hockey tournament, consisting of a series of test matches. It was be held in  Düsseldorf, Germany, from July 14 to 17, 2016, and featured four of the top nations in men's field hockey.

Competition format
The tournament featured the national teams of Belgium, Great Britain, the Netherlands, and the hosts, Germany, competing in a round-robin format, with each team playing each other once. Three points were awarded for a win, one for a draw, and none for a loss.

Results

Matches

Statistics

Goalscorers

References

2016
Men
2016 in German sport
2016 in Belgian sport
2016 in British sport
2016 in Dutch sport
Sport in Düsseldorf
July 2016 sports events in Germany
2010s in Düsseldorf